Nasha Zarya ( - meaning Our Dawn in English) was a legal Menshevik monthly, published in St. Petersburg, Russia from 1910 to 1914. Lenin described it as 'the liquidators' centre in Russia'.

Profile
Nasha Zarya was started by the organizing committee, a leading Menshevik centre.

Notable articles
 "The Contemporary Situation in Russia and the Fundamental Task of the Working Class Movement in the Present Moment" by Nikolai Aleksandrovich Rozhkov.

References

1910 establishments in the Russian Empire
1914 disestablishments in the Russian Empire
Defunct magazines published in Russia
Defunct political magazines
Magazines established in 1910
Magazines disestablished in 1914
Magazines published in Saint Petersburg
Russian-language magazines
Political magazines published in Russia
Socialist magazines